L'enfant Cheikh (English: The Cheikh Child) is a 2012 film directed by Hamid Bénani.

Synopsis 
Said, an old blind man, tells his adopted son about his participance in the resistance to colonial penetration in Tafilalet.

Cast 

 Omar Lotfi
 Sanaa Mouziane
 Farah Fassi
 Mohamed Majd
 Driss Roukhe
 Mohamed Bastaoui

External links

References 

Moroccan drama films
2012 films